Tyrannosorus may refer to:
Tyrannosorus (fungus), an ascomycete genus containing a single species (Tyrannosorus pinicola)
Tyrannosorus (beetle), a fossil beetle genus from the Miocene, containing a single species (Tyrannosorus rex)

See also
Tyrannosaurus, genus of dinosaurs